Meiling Subdistrict is a subdistrict in Jinjiang, Fujian, China. , it has 15 residential communities under its administration.

See also 
 List of township-level divisions of Fujian

References 

Township-level divisions of Fujian
Jinjiang, Fujian